This Is Our Music is the name of two albums:

This Is Our Music (Ornette Coleman album)
This Is Our Music (Galaxie 500 album)